The Israel women's national under-16 basketball team is a national basketball team of Israel, administered by the Israel Basketball Association.
It represents the country in women's international under-16 (under age 16) basketball competitions.

The team lastly appeared at the 2022 FIBA U16 Women's European Championship Division B.

FIBA U16 Women's European Championship

See also
Israel women's national basketball team
Israel women's national under-18 basketball team
Israel men's national under-16 basketball team

References

External links
Archived records of Israel team participations

Basketball in Israel
Basketball teams in Israel
Women's national under-16 basketball teams
B